Liars is the eighteenth album from Todd Rundgren, released in 2004. After a long period of experimentation with multimedia technology and late 20th century musical genres, Rundgren seemed to once again embrace the eclectic pop sensibilities that made him famous, as on his most well-known album, Something/Anything?. As a result, the album received rave reviews, as many considered it a welcome return to form.

Lyrically, every song deals in some way with the issue of truth - focusing more on half-truths than outright lies. From the liner notes:
"All of these songs are about a paucity of truth. At first they may seem to be about other things, but that is just a reflection of how much dishonesty we have accepted in our daily lives. We are raised from birth to believe things that cannot be proven or that are plainly not true. People will often brag of their honesty, when there is so much they have simply chosen to ignore or leave unexamined.
The fact is, we are terrified of the truth."

Mixes
Upon release, the album was pressed onto vinyl. The vinyl running order was mixed as separate tracks to fit the vinyl discs with ease. This version included the songs with clean intros and fade-outs. This master was also used for the Japanese release on CD, whereas every other standard release contained the intended, flowing running order.

Track listing
All tracks are written by Todd Rundgren.
"Truth" – 5:12
"Sweet" – 5:51
"Happy Anniversary" – 4:24
"Soul Brother" – 4:14
"Stood Up" – 4:42
"Mammon" – 4:53
"Future" – 6:04
"Past" – 5:55
"Wondering" – 5:11
"Flaw" – 4:42
"Afterlife" – 3:56
"Living" – 5:37
"God Said" – 7:40
"Liar" – 5:07

Personnel
Todd Rundgren - all vocals and instruments, producer, engineer
 Ken Emerson - slide guitar
 Garn Ian Thomasson - wind

References

Todd Rundgren albums
2004 albums
Albums produced by Todd Rundgren
Sanctuary Records albums